The greater roadrunner (Geococcyx californianus) is a long-legged bird in the cuckoo family, Cuculidae, from the Aridoamerica region in the Southwestern United States and Mexico. The scientific name means "Californian earth-cuckoo". Along with the lesser roadrunner, it is one of two species in the genus Geococcyx. This roadrunner is also known as the chaparral cock, ground cuckoo, and snake killer.

Taxonomy and systematics
Greater roadrunner fossils dating from the Holocene and Pleistocene have been found in California, New Mexico,  Texas, Arizona, and the Mexican state of Nuevo León. The oldest known fossil comes from a cave in New Mexico, estimated at an age of 33,500 years. In the La Brea Tar Pits, fragments from 25 greater roadrunner fossils have been found. Several other fossils are also known from Santa Barbara and Kern counties, as well as Northern Mexico.

Prehistoric remains indicate that up until 8,000 years ago, the greater roadrunner was found in sparse forests rather than scrubby deserts; only later did it adapt to arid environments. Due to this, along with human transformation of the landscape, it has recently started to move northeast of its normal distribution. Sparse forests can be found in these parts, in an environment similar to the prehistoric North American Southwest.

Description  
The upper body is mostly brown with black streaks and sometimes pink spots. The neck and upper breast are white or pale brown with dark brown streaks, and the belly is white. A crest of brown feathers sticks up on the head, and a bare patch of orange and blue skin lies behind each eye; the blue is replaced by white in adult males (except the blue adjacent to the eye), and the orange (to the rear) is often hidden by feathers. Males and females have identical plumage. Females are slightly smaller, on average  shorter and  lighter than males. The long stout beak is grayish brown to gray and has a hooked tip. Roadrunners have four toes on each zygodactyl foot; two face forward, and two face backward. The toes are brown in color and have pale gold spots.

Cases where roadrunners have run as fast as  have been reported.

Vocalizations

The vocalizations of the greater roadrunner have seven distinct variants. This call is usually made early in the morning, from a high perch such as a fence post, dead tree or cactus. This sound is the roadrunner's most common vocalization during the incubation period and the rearing of chicks.

Distribution and habitat 
The greater roadrunner is found in the Aridoamerica ecoregion, within the southwestern United States and northern Mexico. It can be seen regularly in the US states of California, Arizona, New Mexico, Texas, Nevada, Utah, Colorado, and Oklahoma, and less frequently in Kansas, Louisiana, Arkansas, and Missouri, as well as the Mexican states of Baja California, Baja California Sur, Sonora, Sinaloa, Chihuahua, Durango, Jalisco, Coahuila, Zacatecas, Aguascalientes, Guanajuato, Michoacán, Querétaro, México, Puebla, Nuevo León, Tamaulipas, and San Luis Potosí. The species is not migratory.

Behavior

Breeding and nesting

The greater roadrunner is monogamous, forming long-term pair bonds. The male is more territorial, calling out to warn competitors, and does not hesitate to physically push the intruders out of his territory. Some couples defend the same territory all year long.

Nest building starts in March in Texas, and probably later further north. Both birds build the nest, with the male collecting the material and the female constructing the nest. The nests are compact platforms of thorny branches lined with grasses, feathers, snakeskin, roots, and other fine material. They are built low in a cactus or a bush. Greater roadrunners lay three to six eggs, which hatch in 20 days. The chicks fledge in another 18 days. Pairs may occasionally rear a second brood when there is an abundance of food in rainy summers.

Similarly to some other cuckoos, greater roadrunners occasionally lay their eggs in the nests of other birds, such as the common raven and northern mockingbird.

Feeding
This bird walks around rapidly, running down prey. It feeds mainly on small animals including insects, spiders (including black widows), tarantulas, centipedes, scorpions, mice, small birds, including hummingbirds, and especially lizards and small snakes. Venomous serpents, including small rattlesnakes, are readily consumed. Early accounts recount the story that when the roadrunner "sees a rattlesnake, it will gather pieces of cactus and put them around the snake, in such manner that escape is impossible."

Thermoregulation

Because of the greater roadrunner's diurnal nature and arid habitat, it has various biological and behavioral adaptations, known as thermoregulation, to reduce dehydration and overheating. During the hot season, it is active mostly from sunrise to mid-morning, and late afternoon to evening. It rests in the shade during the hottest part of the day. Body water may be retained via liquid reabsorption, by the mucous membranes in the cloaca, rectum and caecum. The roadrunner's nasal glands eliminate excess body salts.

The greater roadrunner reduces excess heat by the formation of water vapor, released by breathing or through the skin. It sometimes pants in heavy heat, to accelerate this action. In the morning, it accelerates heat recovery by sunbathing. In winter, it takes refuge in dense vegetation or among rocks to shelter from cold winds.

The roadrunner frequently sunbathes for warmth. It turns perpendicular to the ground with its back turned towards the sun. Wings apart, the roadrunner ruffles the black feathers on its back and head, exposing its black skin, allowing both skin and feathers to absorb the heat of the sun's rays. Early in the morning, it can stay in this posture for two or three hours.

Locomotion

The Greater Roadrunner can maintain a speed of 30 km per hour over long distances. While running, it places its head and its tail parallel to the ground, and uses its tail as a rudder to help change its direction. It prefers to run in open areas, such as roads, packed trails and dry riverbeds rather than dense vegetation.

The roadrunner less often engages in flight. It hovers from a perch, such as a tree or a human construction.

Relationship to humans
Some Pueblo Native American tribes, including the Hopi, believed the roadrunner provided protection against evil spirits. In Mexico, some said it brought babies, as the white stork was said to in Europe. Some Anglo frontier people believed roadrunners led lost people to trails.

Wile E. Coyote and the Road Runner are the two protagonists of a long-running (since 1949) Warner Bros. animated series.

The greater roadrunner appeared in a 1982 sheet of 20-cent United States stamps showing 50 state birds and flowers, as it is the state bird of New Mexico.

It is also the mascot of numerous high schools and colleges in the United States, including California State University, Bakersfield and the University of Texas at San Antonio. The College of DuPage mascot takes the bird's alternate name, Chapparal, inspired by students driving between various temporary classroom locations before the main campus was fully constructed. The roadrunner is also the mascot of the Tucson Roadrunners, a professional hockey team in Tucson, Arizona.

References

Further reading

External links 

 Greater Roadrunner - Geococyx californianus at Animal Diversity Web
 The Roadrunner at DesertUSA.com
 Greater Roadrunner Species Account – Cornell Lab of Ornithology
 Greater Roadrunner FieldGuide at eNature.com
 Greater Roadrunner at NatureWorks
 
 

greater roadrunner
Native birds of the Western United States
Native birds of the Southwestern United States
Native birds of the Plains-Midwest (United States)
Birds of the United States
Fauna of the Chihuahuan Desert
Fauna of the Mojave Desert
Fauna of the Colorado Desert
Fauna of the Sonoran Desert
Fauna of the California chaparral and woodlands
greater roadrunner
Symbols of New Mexico
Taxa named by René Lesson